William Sands, junior (c.1730-c.1780), was an English architect who worked in Spalding, Lincolnshire. He was the son of the architect William Sands, senior. He is known to have designed three houses in the Spalding High Street in 1768. These were Holland House, Westbourne House and Langton House.

Literature
Antram N (revised), Pevsner N & Harris J, (1989), The Buildings of England: Lincolnshire, Yale University Press. 
Colvin H. A (1995), Biographical Dictionary of British Architects 1600-1840. Yale University Press, 3rd edition London.pg 848
Roberts D L (ed. Shaun Tyas), (2018), Lincolnshire Houses, Tyas, Donnington. .

References

18th-century English architects
Architects from Lincolnshire
Year of birth uncertain
1780 deaths